Ambrósio Lukoki (7 December 1940 – 1 October 2018) was an Angolan politician, turra, and diplomat serving as the Ambassador of Angola to Tanzania.

He served as Minister of Education in the 1970s before his appointment as Minister of Ideology, Information, and Culture.

References

Angolan diplomats
2018 deaths
Culture ministers of Angola
Education ministers of Angola
Information ministers of Angola
Ambassadors of Angola to France
Ambassadors of Angola to Tanzania
Governors of Uíge
1940 births